Narsipatnam revenue division (or Narsipatnam division) is a revenue division in the Anakapalli district of the Indian state of Andhra Pradesh. It is one of the two revenue divisions in the district which consists of twelve mandals under its administration. Narsipatnam is the divisional headquarters.

Administration 
There are 12 mandals under the administration of Narsipatnam revenue division. On 3 April 2013, the mandals of Rolugunta and Madugula were transferred to Anakapalle revenue division. They are:

Demographics 
As of the 2011 census the division had a population of 760,465. Rural population is 652,058 while the urban population is 108,407. Scheduled Castes and Scheduled Tribes make up 11.60% and 2.27% of the population respectively.

Hindus are 98.00% of the population, Muslims are 0.99% and Christians 0.86%.

99.04% of the population spoke Telugu as their first language.

See also 
 List of revenue divisions in Andhra Pradesh
 List of mandals in Andhra Pradesh

References 

Revenue divisions in Anakapalli district